Dancer Equired is the fifth album by Columbus, Ohio-based trio Times New Viking, and their first release for Merge Records.

Track listing
 "It’s a Culture" – 2:23
 "Ever Falling in Love" – 2:36
 "No Room to Live" – 2:20
 "Try Harder" – 1:58
 "California Roll" – 1:38
 "Ways to Go" – 2:28
 "New Vertical Dwellings" – 1:08
 "Downtown Eastern Bloc" – 3:38
 "More Rumours" – 1:59
 "Don’t Go To Liverpool" – 1:51
 "Fuck Her Tears" – 2:08
 "Want to Exist" – 3:00
 "Somebody’s Slave" – 2:45
 "No Good" – 1:40

References

2011 albums
Times New Viking albums
Merge Records albums